Finland competed at the 1998 Winter Paralympics in Nagano, Japan. 21 competitors from Finland won 19 medals including 7 gold, 5 silver and 7 bronze and finished 9th in the medal table.

See also 
 Finland at the Paralympics
 Finland at the 1998 Winter Olympics

References 

1998
1998 in Finnish sport
Nations at the 1998 Winter Paralympics